Sinarcas is a municipality in the Valencian Community (province of Valencia) and is located about one hour's drive inland from the city of Valencia. Primarily an agricultural town, local produce includes grapes, lavender and wheat. There is also a large battery chicken egg production locally.

Geography
The area is surrounded by pine forest and mediterranean scrub including lavender on the hillsides and gets very dry in the Summer. The altitude is around 1000 m and so it is consequently relatively cool in Summer compared with more coastal locations.

This sleepy town has suffered from the emigration of the younger demographic to towns where there is more work to be found.

Cuisine
Local specialities include casseroled Lamb knees and a heavy soup containing home-made pasta and beans.

Places of note in the area and things to do
Las Vinuelas is a privately owned and run hostel and activity centre. It has a swimming pool, archery facilities, frontoncourt, climbing wall and can facilitate horse riding and other local activities, such as traditional bakery and crafts in the village.
Municipal swimming pool
Church
Watersports and canyoning in Benagéber
Tour of Fire Station and demonstration.
La Granja, a local battery chicken egg farm offers tours of its facilities and factory.

Shops and services
Internet facilities in library
Post office
Three shops
Several bars
Primary School
Pharmacy
Fire Station

See also
Sierra de Utiel

References

Municipalities in the Province of Valencia
Requena-Utiel